Safehold is a science fiction book series by David Weber, currently consisting of ten titles, the latest released in January 2019. The series is mostly set around the 31st century, on a distant world dubbed "Safehold" where a group of humans are in hiding from the Gbaba, an alien enemy responsible for the end of all other human civilization.

The humans on Safehold avoid detection by reverting to a pre-electrical, pre-industrial technology base. This status is enforced by a religious belief system discouraging scientific curiosity and forbidding any higher technological innovation on penalty of death. The threat of the Gbaba is barely mentioned in the books so far; the main issue is the divergence of the official church from its original aims versus the outlying areas which deny the leadership of the corrupt vicars.

Every book after the first has a name taken from a hymn.

Plot

Series background

"Earth is dead" 
In the 24th century, the Terran Federation—Earth and its colonies—discovers the ruins of a nearby alien civilization, the victim of an enemy they name the Gbaba. The inevitable confrontation arrives 10 years later. The Federation Navy is well prepared for battle, but it is outnumbered and outgunned. A Terran fleet takes several enemy systems but is quickly overwhelmed when the vast Gbaba main force arrives.

One by one, each colony world is annihilated. A hopeless defense delays the end for several decades. Last-ditch colonies are started on faraway worlds to save the species, but the Gbaba find them all and wipe them out. After the Gbaba attack the Solar System, a final colony fleet escapes after tricking the Gbaba into believing it had been destroyed. A terraforming team led by Pei Shan-Wei arrives first on a new world ahead of 8 million colonists. They name it Safehold.

War against the fallen 
Because signs of technology led the Gbaba to past emergency colonies, the initial mission on Safehold was to restrict all industrialization. Administrator Eric Langhorne overwrites the memory of every colonist, leaving only the original command crew with their memories intact. Yet Langhorne follows his own divergent plan: the colonists awaken to believe they are the first humans, newly created by divine will. They worship Langhorne as the leader of God's "Archangels", charged with guiding a permanent pretechnical society.

Shan-Wei tries to defy this plan change but is labeled a traitor and killed, along with most of her followers, by the orbital bombardment of their Alexandria settlement. Shan-Wei's side retaliates, killing Langhorne and most of his allies, sparking the "War Against the Fallen" among the survivors. Langhorne's "Church of God Awaiting" eventually prevails and sets up a militantly technophobic global theocracy, which deifies and worships Langhorne and demonizes Shan-Wei.

Centuries pass before Shan-Wei's backup plan comes into being. During the terraforming process, Shan-Wei hid an android, with the personality and memories of Nimue Alban, a Terran Federation Navy tactical officer, deep within a secret mountain base. "Nimue's Cave" is stocked with an AI military computer and rooms full of technology. When Nimue awakens, she accepts a mission to destroy the Church and uplift humanity and return to the original plan, which includes destroying the Gbaba for good.

Off Armageddon Reef 

Nimue vows not to repeat the mistakes of the "Archangels", who used technology to perform "divine" acts. As medieval Safehold is likely to taboo a female with great influence, Nimue alters her android body into a male form, becoming Merlin Athrawes.

Merlin selects the island Kingdom of Charis as the source for his uplifting "virus", where he will introduce concepts that force the rest of Safehold to compete. Merlin earns the trust of the ruling Ahrmahk Dynasty and inspires several new "inventions" by Charis' military, science, and economic leaders. Charis' powerful industries change the world by adopting tools like Arabic numerals, the abacus, the cotton gin and spinning jenny, among others. In secret, Merlin teaches the Charisians how to replace their war galleys with a revolutionary fleet of ships of the line.

The lightning pace of innovation, while not directly heretical, causes longstanding Temple suspicions about Charis to boil over. The Church eventually leagues every naval power on Safehold against Charis. Merlin's space-age information net allows the new-model Royal Charisian Navy to annihilate one half of the enemy force in a surprise attack, but King Haarahld is killed when his diversionary fleet is forced into battle outnumbered before the new-model fleet can intervene. King Cayleb buries his father and becomes the first Safeholdian monarch in open rebellion against the Temple.

By Schism Rent Asunder 

Maikel Staynair becomes the first schismatic archbishop in Safehold's history and leader of a rebel "Church of Charis". Groups of "Temple Loyalists" resist the new order, some violently. Merlin barely saves Staynair's life from assassins. Arsonists burn down the Royal College, though Merlin rescues its most important scientist.

Charisian warships enjoy uncontested control of the seas as Charisian privateers shut down unfriendly trade. Leaders of the Mother Church, the Group of Four, retaliate by closing all ports and impounding docked merchant ships. An Inquisition-led massacre ensues in Ferayd, Kingdom of Delferahk. Later on, a Charisian fleet razes Ferayd's waterfront to settle the score.

Staynair takes Merlin to the secret Brethren of Saint Zherneau. Safehold "Adam" Jeremiah Knowles left the memory of humanity's true past to the order's most trusted. Aware for some time that Merlin is superhuman, King Cayleb is allowed to join this "Inner Circle". Merlin makes instant global communication among its members possible.

Cayleb marries Queen Sharleyan of Chisholm, creating the Empire of Charis. Prince Nahrmahn of Emerald capitulates and becomes imperial spymaster. To take the war to the Temple, Charis plans to conquer every realm in its maritime region before invading the mainland. Cayleb assembles his forces and embarks for the first target, Corisande.

By Heresies Distressed 

In Ferayd, Kingdom of Delferahk, the Imperial Charisian Navy proves that the Inquisition murdered innocents. Charis hangs the priests responsible, an unprecedented action. Emperor Cayleb gets a warm welcome in Chisholm during a stop to rally forces and supplies. He continues on to Zebediah, a League of Corisande vassal state. There, he warily accepts the fealty of its governor, who is known for treachery.

The elite Imperial Marines secure a crushing victory in Corisande, but the talented enemy commander retreats to a strategic redoubt. With Merlin's guidance, Charis finds a way around it and forces his surrender. Victory seems inevitable, but the Inquisition assassinates Prince Hektor to smear Cayleb and stir disorder. The Charisians prepare for a difficult occupation. Hektor's children are smuggled to Delferahk.

Merlin fails to detect a plot on Empress Sharleyan back in Charis. His spy drones alert him to the assassins at the last moment, forcing him to unleash his full abilities to fly back and wipe them out. Even so, he nearly fails. This forces him to reveal his "impossible" presence to Sharleyan. She and her lone surviving guard accept the truth and join the Inner Circle.

In Zion, Grand Inquisitor Zaspahr Clyntahn learns that the Temple's military buildup of galleys is obsolete, a costly setback. He performs a minor public penance to control the outrage over the Ferayd massacre. Clyntahn is visited by a fearful member of a secret faction of his political opponents, The Circle, who tells the Inquisition everything. Clyntahn nearly has enough support to declare Holy War, so he bides his time.

A Mighty Fortress 

Occupied Corisande is restless after Hektor's murder. Several Temple Loyalists work to win the hearts of the people. Cayleb vows to avoid repression, but Merlin monitors the resistance. Sharleyan is pregnant and Merlin takes her to "Nimue's Cave" for prenatal care. Merlin reveals he injected her and several others with nanotech; they will never again be sick and will quickly recover from non-fatal injury.

In Corisande, a popular reformist priest denounces the Temple's corruption, helping to quell the resistance. Frustrated Temple Loyalists abduct and torture him to death. Merlin is unable to save him, but arranges for the killers to be caught and executed. Archbishop Staynair makes a visit to Corisande and does much to encourage ecumenism across the Empire of Charis. Merlin breaks up a vast conspiracy that includes Temple Loyalist prelates, Corisandian nobles and the Grand Duke of Zebediah. All are attainted for treason.

In Zion, Clyntahn wins support for Holy War and begins a great purge of reformists from the Temple. Merlin adopts the guise of "Ahbraim Zhevons" of Silkiah to help Madam Ahnzhelyk Phonda get as many to safety as possible. Even so, more than 2,000 people are brutally tortured and murdered by the Inquisition. Clyntahn becomes the dominant member of the Group of Four.

The Earl of Thirsk, the Dohlaran admiral who Cayleb defeated in Off Armageddon Reef, rebuilds his fleet from what he learned. Thirsk wins the first Temple Loyalist naval victory, forcing Admiral Gwylym Manthyr's fleet near Dohlar to surrender. Zion orders its own rebuilt fleet to join with the rebuilt fleet of the Desnairian Empire and attack Charis. A decoy force of Charisian merchant ships tricks the Desnairian Empire's fleet into remaining in port. An emergency force of Charisian ships forever ends the Navy of God's threat to Charis in a daring night attack, at great cost. High Admiral Lock Island, Inner Circle member and beloved cousin to Cayleb, is killed in the battle.

How Firm a Foundation  

Merlin experiments with steam technology. His tests prove that the orbital weapon Langhorne used against Shan-Wei will not automatically target basic industrialization. Charis continues to advance; by this time it is innovating largely without Merlin's help. Father Paityr Wylsynn is inducted into the Inner Circle. He reveals that "Archangel Schueler" trusted his ancient ancestors with a promise that the Archangels will return in 1,000 years (30 years in the future at this time). Merlin prepares contingency plans.

Empress Sharleyan presides at treason trials in the League of Corisande. She orders the execution of nearly all defendants but shows mercy when justified. A Temple Loyalist tries to assassinate her in court. He fails only because of high-tech clothing provided by Merlin. Sharleyan's actions bring the empire's territories closer together. Grand Inquisitor Clyntahn reacts by unleashing Operation Rakurai: Lone operatives commit devastating terror bombings in Charisian lands, killing Prince Nahrmahn, several other important imperial officials, and many innocents.

Earl Thirsk is forced to turn over Admiral Manthyr and his men to the Inquisition. The prisoners are conveyed to Zion, where most die at the hands of Clyntahn's torturers. Back in Charis, Emperor Cayleb retaliates by ordering the summary execution of captured Inquisition agents. In Delferahk, Earl Coris and the children of the late Prince Hektor escape Inquisition custody with Merlin's help. Lieutenant Hektor Aplyn-Ahrmahk, Duke of Darcos, and his men meet up with the fugitives after defeating their pursuers.

In Siddarmark, Clyntahn deploys his "Sword of Schueler", a coup stoked by Temple Loyalist propaganda. A pogrom against Siddar City's Charisian Quarter kills thousands, but the mob is stopped by Aivah Pahrsahn, aka Madam Ahnzhelyk of Zion. Secretly trained and equipped militia in her service save Lord Protector Greyghor Stohnar. Yet the coup does great damage to the republic's resources. A terrible winter sets in as the Temple's vast Army of God prepares to march, leaving the future in doubt.

Midst Toil and Tribulation 

Grand Inquisitor Clyntahn is master of the Church, but its foundations are cracking. Civil war rages in Siddarmark amid a terrible winter. Treasurer General Rhobair Duchairn must deal with the Temple's greatly depreciated tithes; rich Charis and Siddarmark no longer contribute any revenue, and Charis has brought economic havoc to all Temple Loyalist realms. The Army of God marches on Siddarmark, as Charis races to get its own military to the field with Emperor Cayleb in command.

The surviving royal family of Corisande travel home with Archbishop Staynair, where Princess Irys falls in love with her rescuer Duke Hektor Aplyn-Ahrmahk. Over time, Charis integrates Corisande as a constituent kingdom of its empire with Irys' brother Daivyn on the throne. Irys is betrothed to Hektor to seal the deal. Empress Sharleyan's leadership further unifies the people of Charis, Chisholm, Corisande, Emerald and recently absorbed Tarot under a rapidly industrializing imperial state.

Merlin "resurrects" Charis' spymaster, Prince Nahrmahn, inside a virtual reality simulation populated by the tactical AI "Owl." Though just as Merlin is uncertain that he is truly a reborn version of Nimue Alban, Nahrmahn has doubts about his existence. A meeting with his "widow" Ohlyvya enabled by Merlin makes him resolve to go on while she lives. As time passes differently in the virtual world, Nahrmahn is able to spend a great deal of it with Owl, helping the AI become self-aware. The two prove to be a mental asset to an increasingly weary Merlin.

Siddarmark survives the winter and Cayleb's forces arrive. The Temple's brutal tactics start to backfire as its forces lose popular support in the Republic. Advanced Charisian weapons and tactics turn the tide on the battlefield, but the Temple and its allies still greatly outnumber the Reformists. Charis deploys new steam-powered ironclads, shutting down the Army of God's supply lines, but not in time to save a forward-deployed force of Imperial Marines who are surrounded and killed to a man. Yet, amid the tragedy, success in the war becomes possible.

Like a Mighty Army 
The Temple struggles to adapt to Charisian economic warfare, but the Group of Four determine to use their overwhelming numbers to try to win out before a sustained offense becomes impossible to support. Duke Eastshare of the Imperial Charisian Army weathers the Army of God's assault. The situation appears more dire for the Earl of Hanth in the south, but incompetent Temple Loyalist commanders play into his hands. With the help of Merlin and his various guises providing key information, the Reformists gain the upper hand throughout Siddarmark.

Princess Irys' wedding in Corisande is interrupted by a suicide bomber in Clyntahn's service. Her new husband Duke Hektor is severely wounded; Merlin barely manages to save his life. This need to be in several places at once places an incredible strain on the seijin, but Nahrmahn and Owl figure out how to construct a new cybernetic avatar like Merlin. "Nimue Chwaerieau" awakens as Merlin did some years before. She becomes the first female member of the Imperial Guard, eroding gender barriers throughout the empire by example.

The desperate Group of Four authorize a broad adoption of Charisian innovations and tactics, unwittingly playing into Merlin's ultimate goal to uplift all of Safehold. The cost is high; every Charisian victory prompts brutal pogroms against nearby settlements to weed out "heretics". Enraged, Merlin slips behind enemy lines under the guise of "Dialydd Mab" (Welsh for "Avenging Son"), slaying many agents of the Inquisition.

Charisian success causes divisions among the Temple Loyalist forces, allowing the Reformists to begin routing them in detail; one battle with the army of the Empire of Desnair causes 90 percent enemy casualties. The Empire of Harchong's massive serf army becomes modernized and remains a grave threat, but Charisian commanders express confidence that total victory is within reach.

Hell's Foundations Quiver 

Merlin learns of a secret monastic order that maintains the tomb and journal of Cody Cortazar, aka Seijin Kohdy. A Safeholdian legend formerly thought fictional, Kohdy fought for the Temple during the War Against the Fallen. His residual memories of life during the last days of the Terran Federation caused him to seek answers from the "Archangels", who tried to erase him from history. Mother Superior Nynian Rychtair—the savior of the Siddarmarkian state at the start of the "Jihad"—is admitted to the Inner Circle.

Charis deploys technology equivalent to the late 19th/early 20th century. Bolt-action rifles, grenades, land mines, massed artillery and corps-level tactics prove decisive against Temple forces. Charis shatters the starving, demoralized Army of God. Eventually, the Reformists liberate nearly all of Siddarmark. The Temple kills or deports Siddarmarkian "heretics" to date held in concentration camps. Efforts by Merlin (as "Dialydd Mab") rescue many, but the offensive cannot continue while they are cared for.

Although the Kingdom of Dohlar is being defeated on land, its navy under Admiral Thirsk remains a threat. The loss in battle of HMS Dreadnought, a state-of-the-art oceangoing ironclad, and delays in the introduction of the King Haarahld class of battleship set back the plan to regain total control of the seas. Charisian prisoners from Dreadnought are rescued from Gwylym Manthyr's fate by a daring nighttime raid, but Dreadnought is captured almost intact for study by the enemy.

Grand Inquisitor Clyntahn blames Thirsk for losing the prisoners and plans to have Thirsk killed as soon as his naval leadership is no longer needed. The Inquisition uncovers a plan to smuggle the admiral's family to safety. One of Thirsk's aides diverts suspicion, posing as a Charisian agent. He slays several Inquisitors and nonlethally shoots Thirsk before killing himself to protect the truth. Even so, Clyntahn compels Thirsk's family to go to Zion. Merlin and Nimue rescue them from a Navy of God ship, destroying it and all evidence of their survival. Later, Merlin visits a mournful and withdrawn Thirsk in secret.

At the Sign of Triumph 

Merlin informs Admiral Thirsk of his family's survival in Dohlar, and offers him the "freedom" to uphold or undermine the Church's goals. Thirsk remains loyal to Dohlar and continues to lead its efforts to resist Reformist forces.

General Hanth launches a new offensive against the Royal Dohlaran Army and, using combined-arms strategy enabled by squad-level infantry tactics and massive artillery barrages, proceeds to dig the RDA out of entrenched defenses that had been thought impregnable. At the same time, Charis' new armored warships, led by the first of the new King Haarahld class of battleships, establish total Charisian control of the sea and render all enemy shore fortifications obsolete. After several months of protracted fighting on land and sea, Admiral Thirsk makes his move, seizing control of his government with the help of reform-minded and war-weary cohorts in the Dohlaran military and clergy, leading to the kingdom's withdrawal from the Jihad.

In the north, the Harchongese Mighty Host of God and the Archangels is outmaneuvered by the use of Charisian non-rigid Zeppelin-style observation balloons for directing troop movements and indirect fire. Reformist armies converge and seize the initiative against the last organized army loyal to the Temple. Simultaneously, frustration against the Inquisition for years of butchery and corruption boils over as rebel mobs rally behind Vicar Rhobair Duchairn. Clyntahn flees the Temple but is intercepted by Merlin and Nimue. Later, Clyntahn is presented incontrovertible proof of the lies that the Church is founded on, and goes to the gallows a broken man.

With the Jihad over at last, Duchairn becomes the new Grand Vicar and promulgates reform, but the Temple fractures into several national branches akin to the Church of Charis. The Inner Circle decides that in the short term, peace is more important than overthrowing Mother Church and its doctrine. Therefore, it is decided, Safehold cannot yet confront the truth about its past. Charis cements permanent ties with Siddarmark and begins a rapprochement with Dohlar. Merlin and Nimue, aware how their mission is far from over as the immortal guides of humanity, look toward a brighter future.

Through Fiery Trials 
The tenth book in the Safehold series, was released on January 8, 2019.

After winning the war against the Church of God Awaiting, Merlin and the others are preparing for the prophetic 1,000-year-return of the so-called archangels. This possible event constitutes a danger to the development of the human race on Safehold since it was the so-called archangels that set up the Church of God Awaiting specifically to keep the human race wallowing in Middle Ages technology. Although the Charisians have not violated the proscriptions against technology, they have come fairly close with such things as steam engines and dirigibles. Meanwhile, Harchong has been coming apart, and a possible war is building there. Decades pass. Some of the great leaders of the past war are now gone or too old to get out of bed. Children introduced earlier in the series are now old enough to marry, and thus they are possible major characters for the next book in the series. And finally, a sign from the 'archangels' seems to appear.

Reception 
Six of the books in the series debuted on the New York Times Hardcover Fiction Best Seller List. Off Armageddon Reef was a cumulative bestseller, entering the New York Times Best Seller list at number 33. It was listed by Booklist as one of the top ten SF audiobooks of 2008 and was nominated in 2009 for the Arthur C. Clarke Award for best science fiction novel published in the United Kingdom. The Guardian found Off Armageddon Reef to have a predictable ending and called the character development "perfunctory", but applauded Weber's pacing and vision.

By Heresies Distressed debuted at number 11 on the July 17, 2009 New York Times best selling hardcover fiction list, number 25 on the July 24, 2009 list, and number 30 on the July 30, 2009 list.

A Mighty Fortress debuted at #9 on the New York Times hardcover fiction best seller list, dropped to #24 in the second week, then to #29 in week three before dropping off the list, for a total of three weeks on the list.

Like a Mighty Army debuted at #5 on the New York Times hardcover fiction best seller list.

Hell's Foundations Quiver debuted at #16 on the New York Times hardcover fiction best seller list.

At the Sign of Triumph debuted at #14 on the New York Times hardcover fiction best seller list.

Through Fiery Trials debuted at #12 on the New York Times hardcover fiction best seller list.

References

External links 
 Official Safehold series page (on David Weber's site)

Military science fiction novels
Novels by David Weber
Post-apocalyptic novels
Publications established in 2007
Science fiction book series